Van Benschoten House and Guest House is a historic home and guest house located at Margaretville in Delaware County, New York, United States. It is an example of late 19th summer boarding house design applied to a working farmhouse.  The main house was built about 1890 and its exterior massing of the two story main residence is broken up into four gabled pavilions emanating from a hipped-roof core in the Queen Anne style.  It features an octagonal tower with a tall pointed roof.  Also on the property is a cow barn.

It was listed on the National Register of Historic Places in 2002.

See also
National Register of Historic Places listings in Delaware County, New York

References

Houses on the National Register of Historic Places in New York (state)
National Register of Historic Places in Delaware County, New York
Queen Anne architecture in New York (state)
Houses completed in 1867
Houses in Delaware County, New York